John Rhoderic McPherson (May 9, 1833October 8, 1897) was a businessman and politician from Jersey City, New Jersey. A Democrat, he served as a United States senator for three terms, 1877 to 1895.

A native of York, New York, McPherson raised livestock and worked as a butcher before moving to Jersey City, New Jersey, in 1858, where he dealt in livestock and became a prominent businessman in the meatpacking industry. An inventor, he devised or created improvements that enhanced sanitation and efficiency in slaughterhouses, many of which were later employed as industry standards.

Active in politics as a Democrat, McPherson served on the Jersey City Board of Aldermen, as president of the Board of Aldermen, and as a member of the New Jersey State Senate. In 1877, McPherson was elected to the United States Senate. He was reelected twice and served from 1877 to 1895. During his Senate service, McPherson spent several terms as chairman of the Naval Affairs Committee.

After leaving the Senate, McPherson resumed his activities in the meatpacking business. He died in Jersey City on October 8, 1897. He was buried at Oak Hill Cemetery in Washington, D.C.

Early life
McPherson was born in York, New York, on May 9, 1833. He was educated in the public schools of York and attended Geneseo Academy. He farmed, raised livestock, and worked as a butcher before moving to Jersey City, New Jersey, in 1858.

Career
In Jersey City, McPherson became a prominent livestock dealer and slaughterhouse owner. As an inventor, McPherson designed or improved several devices and processes to promote efficient and sanitary slaughterhouse operations, many of which were adopted as meatpacking industry standards. McPherson's other business activities included serving as a director or officer of several banks, and president of Jersey City's People's Gas Light Company.

McPherson was active in politics as a Democrat. He served on the Jersey City Board of Aldermen from 1864 to 1870, and was the board's president for three years. In 1871, he was elected to a term in the New Jersey Senate, and he served from 1872 to 1876. McPherson was a Democratic presidential elector in 1876. Democratic nominee Samuel J. Tilden carried New Jersey, and McPherson cast his ballot for the ticket of Tilden and Thomas A. Hendricks.

U.S. Senator
In 1877, McPherson was elected to the United States Senate. He was reelected in 1883 and 1889, and served from March 4, 1877, to March 3, 1895. He served as chairman of the Committee on Naval Affairs during the 46th Congress (1879–1881), and again during the 53rd Congress (1893–1895).

McPherson was a delegate to the 1884 Democratic National Convention. Initially pledged to Thomas F. Bayard, when it became clear after the second ballot that Grover Cleveland had garnered enough votes to win the nomination, McPherson backed Cleveland, who went on to win the general election. McPherson supported Cleveland in 1888, but Cleveland lost the general election to Republican Benjamin Harrison.

McPherson planned a favorite son presidential candidacy in 1892, but became a Cleveland delegate to the Democratic Convention after Cleveland decided to become a candidate. When Cleveland became president for the second time in 1893, McPherson became an opponent because Cleveland did not consult with him on questions of federal patronage for New Jersey.

Later life
After leaving the Senate, McPherson actively managed his livestock and meatpacking business, the Western Stockyard Company, from an office in New York City. In May 1897, William Van Aken, a former McPherson business and political associate, attempted to shoot McPherson over claims that McPherson had cheated him in a business deal twenty years earlier. Van Aken, who was nearly blind, was acquitted of attempted murder. He was subsequently indicted for carrying a concealed weapon. Van Aken pleaded guilty to the charge and paid a $10 fine.

Death and burial

McPherson died in Jersey City, New Jersey, on October 8, 1897. He was buried in Oak Hill Cemetery in Washington, D.C. McPherson sometimes used "MacPherson", the original Scottish spelling of his name, and his family grave marker is inscribed with the "Mac" prefix. In addition, some sources including his gravestone indicate that his year of birth was 1832, though most sources give it as 1833.

Family

In 1868, McPherson married Edla Jane Gregory (1845–1901). Their children included Gregory (1868–1896) and Edla (1873–1901), who was known as Ella. In 1898, Ella McPherson married Dr. Joseph Muir.

When McPherson died, his wife inherited his estate, which was estimated at $500,000 (about $15.5 million in 2020). When Edla Gregory McPherson died in early 1901, news accounts revealed that she had disapproved of her daughter's marriage and changed her will to provide Ella McPherson Muir only an annual income from the estate during her life, with the bulk being donated to Yale University, of which Gregory McPherson was an alumnus. Mrs. Muir contested the will, but died in late 1901 while the court case was still in progress.

Dr. Muir continued to contest the will as his wife's heir. The estate was settled in late 1902 with payments to Dr. Muir, Yale University, and members of the extended McPherson family. With his second wife, Joseph Muir was the father of architect Edla Muir, whom he named after his first wife.

References

Sources

Books

Newspapers

Magazines

Internet

External links

Democratic Party New Jersey state senators
Politicians from Jersey City, New Jersey
Democratic Party United States senators from New Jersey
1833 births
1897 deaths
Burials at Oak Hill Cemetery (Washington, D.C.)
19th-century American politicians
1876 United States presidential electors